The boulder finch or short-tailed finch (Idiopsar brachyurus) is a species of bird previously placed in the family Emberizidae, but it appears to be related to the sierra finches Phrygilus of the tanager family Thraupidae and is now placed there. 

It is found in Argentina, Bolivia, and Peru.
Its natural habitat is subtropical or tropical high-altitude grassland.

References

boulder finch
Birds of the Bolivian Andes
boulder finch
Taxonomy articles created by Polbot
Tanagers